Eastwood Collegiate Institute is a public high school located at 760 Weber Street East in Kitchener, Ontario, Canada. It was established in 1956. The school teams are known as the "Lions
". Eastwood is known for its Provincially ranked soccer teams, as well as its Integrated Arts Program. Its motto is Ex Oriente Lux.

Construction
The school was built in 1956, located on what was then the recently extended East Avenue (now Weber Street).  The architect for the building was the company of Barnett & Rieder.  Most of the school consists of a long classroom block that runs parallel to Weber Street.  There is a large entrance stair at the south side of the classroom block, with the school offices to the north and the gymnasium, whose walls are of ribbed brick, to the south.  The architecture of the school received international attention when it opened.

Crest

The School's crest was designed by Former Eastwood Student Doug Rickert in 1957. Designed to reveal both the school's name but also the components of its life blood. According to the 1956-1957 Eastwood Yearbook, CHIPS, "The rising sun...denotes not only 'East', but also the light given by our leadership to other schools and the community around us. The maple leaves provide the 'wood', and in addition signify our pride in holding a place in the educational system of Canada. The open book signifies the great store of knowledge readily available, and the desire to receive it, both present in our school. The motto...has also been included in the attractive crest which is a suitable emblem of our school".

The Auditorium and Tech Crew

Eastwood Collegiate Institute is currently the only school in the Waterloo Regional District School Board (WRDSB) that boasts an industry-standard auditorium facility. The auditorium seats just under 500 people. It is also equipped with a custom-installed hemp rope system (named for the type of rope once used) with over 20 bars. The lighting inventory is also the largest in the region's school board. The aud is run and maintained by ECI's Tech Crew. Tech Crew is responsible for shows in and outside of the auditorium, totaling over 15 major shows each year. These may include seasonal Dance Shows and Music Shows, the annual arts program Gala, the semiannual Musical Production, the Commencement ceremonies, School Dances and the annual Spring playday ('Spring Thing'). Hours contributed by the ETC gross 5000 annually

The Mascot

Note: The mascot was changed to simply "The Lions" in 2020.  The logo features a mountain lion and flames. 

The school's original mascot, Johnny Rebel, was chosen to represent Eastwood's original rebellious spirit (many of the original teachers had left KCI to come to Eastwood). In 1998, it was decided that Johnny Rebel no longer personified what it meant to be a Rebel because of the attached history and racism of the Confederate army's fight to maintain slavery. At that point, the Confederate flag was a prominent feature of his costume, and a version of the flag could be seen on the previous cafeteria mural, with Canadian Maple-Leaves replacing the stars). A contest was held among the students and staff to design a new mascot. Eventually, it was decided that two lions (one male and one female, wearing a football jersey and a basketball jersey respectively, would be used to reflect the school's "Rebel Pride". In 2005, another contest was held for another overhaul of the mascot, with students and staff again submitting designs. Ultimately, a design by former Eastwood art teacher David Okum was selected. The "Rebel Lion" combines both old and new - a lion in an updated soldier's uniform. The name was chosen so that when the words were pushed together, the word "Rebellion" was formed.. In 2020 the school announced that they were seeking alternatives to the name Rebel.   Both as a response to cultural shifts, and an attempt to self-define future vision, the school undertook garnering staff, student and community suggestions for exploring new mascots, and imagery.

Waterloo Region Integrated Arts Program
Eastwood is particularly noted for its specialized arts program, known as the "Integrated Arts Program". The Arts Program offers courses in Drama, Dance, Music: Instrumental, Strings, Vocal, and Visual arts. Talented students come to Eastwood from all over Waterloo Region and beyond to be an Arts Program student. Keeping to its integrated nature, academics are incredibly important and necessary for all students.  Success in academics as well as arts to attain a high-school diploma is mandatory.

The Specialist High Skills Major: Arts & Culture

This new program complements the already successful IAP.
This program is newly developed and brings the technical side of the arts to the students.  Programs in lighting, sound, stage managing, stage and set design, costume design and creation, are just a few of the offerings.  Supported in part by members of Waterloo Region's Arts Community, the program began in the 2008-2009 school year.

Renovations
In recent years the school has had a number of much needed renovations. A new library, dance studio, front steps, elevator, a re-vitalized woodworking shop, a (recently demolished) costume room, and a brand new sprinkler system completed in 2005 to bring the school up to fire code.

Beginning March 2007, a massive renovation began at the school, which includes new windows for the whole building, new ventilation system, new boiler system, and hiding the sprinkler pipes installed 2 years prior. Air conditioning is being installed, but will not be available to the whole school, only certain special parts will have it (such as computer labs) but the average classroom will not.

In 2020 a new, large and modern weight-room was added, along with an innovative and flexible multi-purpose Technology Studies Room and a new general Multi-purpose Room. In response to a new Green Industries program, a chicken run and raised vegetables beds were built. In 2021, Science and Family Studies Rooms were updated and plans were made to renovate the washrooms and add additional gender neutral washrooms - due to Covid, this work has been re-scheduled for summer 2022.

Special events
 Eastwood Collegiate celebrated its 50th anniversary in 2006.
 They received a special visit from former Canadian Prime Minister Paul Martin in 2006.
 They celebrated its 60th anniversary in 2016.

Notable alumni
 Charity Brown - Recording artist
 David Barr Chilton - Author of The Wealthy Barber, speaker, and television personality on Dragons' Den (Canada)
 Dave Farrow - Guinness World Record Holder (Memory)
 Markus Koch - Former NFL defensive lineman for the Washington Commanders (then Redskins) and Super Bowl champion
 Gabriel Landeskog - Active NHL hockey player and captain of the Colorado Avalanche
 Kneale Mann - Former program director and music director at CFNY-FM, CHTZ-FM, CJDV-FM, and CILV-FM; now marketing advisor for Central Ontario Broadcasting
 Sandra Murray - Psychologist and Author
 Alex Mustakas - Artistic Director & CEO of Drayton Entertainment
 Angelo Raffin - Canadian football player (Montreal Alouettes, Toronto Argonauts), Grey Cup winner with Montreal in 1970
 Karen Redman - Former member of Parliament, Parliamentary Secretary to the Minister of the Environment, and Chief Government Whip, now Regional Chair for Waterloo Region
 Mike Richards - Former NHL hockey player (Philadelphia Flyers, Los Angeles Kings, Washington Capitals)
 Jeff Skinner - Active NHL hockey player (Carolina Hurricanes, Buffalo Sabres)
 Mike Stevens - Retired NHL hockey player (Vancouver Canucks, Boston Bruins, New York Islanders, Toronto Maple Leafs)
 Scott Stevens - Retired NHL hockey player (Washington Capitals, St. Louis Blues, New Jersey Devils); inducted into the Hockey Hall Of Fame (2007); three-time Stanley Cup winner, and named one of the Top 100  NHL Players of all Time 
 Fitzroy Vanderpool - Boxing champion

See also
List of high schools in Ontario

References

External links

Eastwood Jazz Combo Website
Official Website of the Waterloo Region District School board

Waterloo Region District School Board
Educational institutions established in 1956
High schools in the Regional Municipality of Waterloo
Schools in Kitchener, Ontario
1956 establishments in Ontario